The Ukrainian women's national 3x3 team represents Ukraine in international 3x3 basketball matches and is controlled by the Ukrainian Basketball Federation.

As of May 2021, Ukraine was especially known for their height. All four of their players were around 1.83m (6ft), taller than most rivals.

Performances

World Championships

European Games

European Championships

World Mixed Championships

See also
 3x3 basketball
 Ukraine men's national 3x3 team

References

External links 
 Ukrainian Basketball Federation
 Ukraine's County Profile at FIBA.com

Women's national 3x3 basketball teams
Ukraine women's national basketball team